David Armstrong (26 December 1954 – 21 August 2022) was an English footballer who played as an attacking midfielder. He spent most of his career with Middlesbrough (from 1972 to 1981), before moving to Southampton in August 1981, where he played for a further six seasons. He finished his league career with AFC Bournemouth in 1987–88.

Football career
Armstrong was part of the Middlesbrough side of the 1970s managed by Jack Charlton which won the Second Division title and was a consistent Division One team for most of the decade. Towards the end of his time at Middlesbrough, he gained his first England cap. At Ayresome Park, Armstrong was noted for his remarkable durability – for many years he was ever-present in the #11 shirt, and as a testament to this was awarded a testimonial whilst aged only 25. He holds the Boro' record for most consecutive appearances with 305 consecutive league games and 358 consecutive games in all competitions between March 1972 and August 1980.

He joined Southampton in August 1981 and scored 15 league goals in his first season alongside Kevin Keegan, as the Saints led the table for most of the first three months of 1982 before finishing seventh. He came close to a league title medal again in 1984, as the Saints finished runners-up to Liverpool in the league and were also semi-finalists in the FA Cup. He scored 15 league goals again. And in 1984–85, he scored 10 times in the league and the Saints finished fifth. He helped the Saints reach another FA Cup semi-final in 1985–86, and again totalled 10 goals in the league. However, he was dropped from the team during the 1986–87 season, scoring just once in 22 league games. At the end of that season, he dropped down a division to sign for AFC Bournemouth, where he spent one season before retiring as a player. At Southampton, he had scored 59 league goals in six seasons.

He was Southampton FC's Player of the Season in 1983–84, and he also made three appearances for the England international team between 1980 and 1984.

Honours
Middlesbrough
 Football League Division 2: 1973–1974

Southampton
Football League Division 1 runners-up: 1983–84

Anglo Scottish cup winner 1976 Middlesbrough

References

1954 births
2022 deaths
Sportspeople from Durham, England
Footballers from County Durham
English footballers
Association football midfielders
England international footballers
England B international footballers
England under-23 international footballers
English Football League players
Southampton F.C. players
Middlesbrough F.C. players
AFC Bournemouth players